Antanas Mikėnas (February 27, 1924 – September 23, 1994) was a Lithuanian athlete who competed mainly in the 20 kilometer walk during his career. He trained at Spartak in Vilnius. Mikėnas competed for the USSR at the 1956 Summer Olympics held in Melbourne, Australia where he won the silver medal in the men's 20 kilometer walk competition.

References
Antanas Mikėnas' profile at Sports Reference.com
Biography of Antanas Mikėnas 

1924 births
1994 deaths
Lithuanian male racewalkers
Olympic silver medalists for the Soviet Union
Athletes (track and field) at the 1956 Summer Olympics
Olympic athletes of the Soviet Union
Spartak athletes
Lithuanian athletics coaches
Soviet male racewalkers
Medalists at the 1956 Summer Olympics
Olympic silver medalists in athletics (track and field)